Cossulus sheljuzhkoi is a species of moth of the family Cossidae. It is found in Kazakhstan, Kyrgyzstan, Uzbekistan, Tajikistan and Israel.

Adults have been recorded on wing in June in Israel.

References

Moths described in 1936
Cossinae
Moths of Asia